Pompignan is a commune in the Gard department in the Occitania region of Southern France. It is situated on the departmental border with Hérault, 30 km (18.6 mi) north of Montpellier. In 2019, Pompignan had a population of 957.

Demographics

See also
Communes of the Gard department

References

Communes of Gard